Georgina Ballantine (25 November 1889 – 12 April 1970) was a Scottish nurse, registrar and salmon fisher. In 1922, Ballantine landed a 64lb salmon on the River Tay, the largest recorded from a British river with rod and line.

Biography 
Georgina Ballantine was born on 25 November 1889, in Caputh, Scotland. Her mother was Christina White and her father was James Ballantine, a registrar and ghillie.

Ballantine worked as a nurse from 1914 to 1919, in Perth, London and Bapaume in France. It was in France she was decorated by the Red Cross. She later worked as registrar in Caputh.

In her later life, Ballantine suffered from arthritis in both legs, and as a result they were both amputated.

Ballantine died on 12 April 1970 in Caputh.

Record landing of the Great Tay Salmon 
On 7 October 1922, Ballantine was fishing with her father, on the Glendelvine Water. Following a two-hour struggle, she landed a 64lb salmon, the largest recorded taken from a British river with rod and line, and half Ballantine's own weight. The salmon, known as the Great Tay Salmon, was 54 inches in length and 28.5 inches in girth.

Her record was still unchallenged in 2007, when another female angler, Bev Street, broke the record for largest caught freshwater fish by landing a 66lb catfish at Bluebell Lakes in Peterborough. Ballantine retains the record for largest rod caught salmon.

A watercolour painting by A. J. Rennie depicting the fish hung in the dining room of the Flyfishers Club in London, despite the fact that Ballantine, as a woman, would not be admitted to the gentlemen's club.

Ballantine's salmon was donated to Perth Royal Infirmary, and a cast was donated to the Pall Mall angling emporium.  A model is exhibited in a display in Perth Museum.

References 

1889 births
1970 deaths
British fishers
Scottish nurses